William Henry Heap Hutchinson (31 October 1849 – 4 July 1929) was an English rugby union footballer who played in the 1870s. He played at representative level for England, and at club level for Hull FC, as a forward, e.g. front row, lock, or back row. Prior to Thursday 29 August 1895, Hull F.C. was a rugby union club.

Backgorun
William Hutchinson's birth was registered in Sculcoates district, he died in Beverley.

Playing career

International honours
William Hutchinson won caps for England while at Hull F.C. in 1874–75 Home Nations rugby union match against Ireland, and in the 1875–76 Home Nations rugby union match against Ireland.

Change of Code
When Hull F.C. converted from the rugby union code to the rugby league code on Thursday 29 August 1895, William Hutchinson would have been 45 years of age. Consequently, he would have been too old to have been a rugby league footballer for Hull FC.

References

External links
Search for "Hutchinson" at rugbyleagueproject.org

1849 births
1929 deaths
Hull F.C. players
England international rugby union players
English rugby union players
Rugby union players from Beverley
Rugby union forwards